Operation Zeppelin may refer to one of the two operations during World War II:

 Operation Zeppelin (espionage plan), a 1941–45 German scheme to recruit Soviet POWs for espionage behind Russian lines
 Operation Zeppelin (deception plan), a 1944 Allied scheme to divert attention from the invasion of Normandy